Arima Subdistrict  is a subdistrict of al-Bab District in northern Aleppo Governorate, northwestern Syria. The administrative centre is Arima. At the 2004 census, the subdistrict had a population of 32,041.

Cities, towns and villages

References 

Al-Bab District
Arima